The World Gasoline Engine is a family of straight-4 piston engines, based on the Global Engine Alliance design.

Three engines have been produced: a 1.8 L, a 2.0 L, and a  2.4 L. With 1.8 L variant being used on vehicles sold outside of the United States. The initial design of the engine block and cylinder head was handled by Hyundai as part of the Global Engine Alliance. The engines feature an aluminum engine block with siamesed cast iron cylinder liners (that is cylinder liners that don't allow coolant to flow between adjacent liners). By using cylinder liners the engine's bore can be altered, therefore the displacement as well, just by adding a different set of cylinder liners. The engine also features an aluminum cylinder head with double overhead camshafts and variable valve timing.

1.8

The compression ratio is 10.5:1.

The 1.8L DOHC inline 4-cylinder engine served as the standard engine in the Dodge Caliber SE and SXT trim for the 2007–2009 model years.

Applications:
2007–2009 Dodge Caliber SE and SXT,   torque

2.0

The compression ratio of the engine is 10.5:1.
The 2.0 L engine was offered by Dodge in the Dodge Caliber. Outside North America, the 2.0 was the base engine for the 2007 Chrysler Sebring and 2008 Dodge Avenger.

Applications:
2007–2012 Dodge Caliber SE and SXT,  and  torque
2007–2017 Jeep Patriot (4x2 models only)
2007–2017 Jeep Compass (4x2 models only)
Dodge Avenger (outside North America)
Chrysler Sebring (outside North America)

2.4

The 2.4 L,  engine was used by Dodge in the R/T trim line of the Caliber. A  turbocharged variant of this engine was used in the high-performance SRT-4 version of the Caliber.

Applications:
2007–2010 Chrysler Sebring
2011–2014 Chrysler 200 / Lancia Flavia
2008–2014 Dodge Avenger
2007–2011 Dodge Caliber R/T,  and SRT-4, 
2009–2020 Dodge Journey
2011–2016 Fiat Freemont (Brazilian market)
2007–2017 Jeep Compass
2007–2017 Jeep Patriot

Tigershark
The Tigershark engine family is the name for the next generation of World Gas Engines with work starting on them shortly after acquisition of Chrysler. The major differences compared to the first generation are the updated valvetrain and intakes.

2.0

Applications:

2.4
Only Multi-Air heads feature electro-hydraulic variable valve timing and lift, although only on the intake side. The system is based on FIAT technology.

Applications:

See also
Hyundai Theta engine - Hyundai's GEMA built engines
Mitsubishi 4B1 engine - Mitsubishi's GEMA built engines
List of Chrysler engines

References

External links
Additional information on the World engine, Allpar.com

Automobile engines
World